Louis Rudolph may refer to:

 Louis Rudolph, Duke of Brunswick-Lüneburg (1671–1735)
 Louis C. Rudolph (1816–1897), president of Santa Clara University